Alain Dominique Zoubga (born 1953 in Poa) is a Burkinabe politician and medical doctor who has served in the government of Burkina Faso as Minister of Social Action since 2013. Previously, he was appointed as Minister of Health by President Blaise Compaoré following the 1987 coup d'état and served until 1989. Dr. Zougba currently leads the Party for Democracy and Progress / Socialist Party (PDP-PS).

References
 "Health services and quality in Burkina Faso" African Societies

1953 births
Living people
Party for Democracy and Progress / Socialist Party politicians
Government ministers of Burkina Faso
Burkinabé physicians
21st-century Burkinabé people
Health ministers of Burkina Faso